Barton Creek is a census-designated place (CDP) in Travis County, Texas, United States. As of the 2010 census, the CDP population was 3,077.

Barton Creek is ranked second in Texas based on per capita income.

Geography
Barton Creek is located at  (30.285534, -97.865771).

According to the United States Census Bureau, the CDP has a total area of 5.4 square miles (13.9 km2), all of it land.

Demographics
As of the census of 2000, there were 1,589 people, 707 households, and 509 families residing in the CDP. The population density was 296.4 people per square mile (114.5/km2). There were 754 housing units at an average density of 140.6/sq mi (54.3/km2). The racial makeup of the CDP was 93.20% White, 2.39% African American, 0.19% Native American, 2.77% Asian, 0.06% Pacific Islander, 0.50% from other races, and 0.88% from two or more races. Hispanic or Latino of any race were 3.71% of the population.

There were 707 households, out of which 22.1% had children under the age of 18 living with them, 67.6% were married couples living together, 3.5% had a female householder with no husband present, and 28.0% were non-families. 22.3% of all households were made up of individuals, and 1.1% had someone living alone who was 65 years of age or older. The average household size was 2.25 and the average family size was 2.63.

In the CDP, the population was spread out, with 17.6% under the age of 18, 4.3% from 18 to 24, 29.5% from 25 to 44, 40.1% from 45 to 64, and 8.5% who were 65 years of age or older. The median age was 44 years. For every 100 females, there were 100.4 males. For every 100 females age 18 and over, there were 101.7 males.

The median income for a household in the CDP was $158,623, and the median income for a family was $172,909. Males had a median income of $100,000 versus $44,716 for females. The per capita income for the CDP was $110,504. About 1.3% of families and 3.6% of the population were below the poverty line, including none of those under the age of eighteen or sixty-five or over.

Education
All of the CDP is in the Austin Independent School District.
 It is zoned to Oak Hill Elementary School, O'Henry Middle School, and Austin High School.

The private Catholic high school St. Michael's Catholic Academy is in Barton Creek.

References

Census-designated places in Texas
Census-designated places in Travis County, Texas
Census-designated places in Greater Austin